Schwartziella angularis is a species of minute sea snail, a marine gastropod mollusk or micromollusk in the family Zebinidae. The species name refers to the angulated subsutural shoulder of the shell.

Description
The height of the shell attains 4 mm.

Distribution
This species occurs in the Atlantic Ocean off the Cape Verdes.

References

 Rolán E., 2005. Malacological Fauna From The Cape Verde Archipelago. Part 1, Polyplacophora and Gastropoda.

angularis
Gastropods described in 2000
Gastropods of Cape Verde